Gregory N. Todd is a United States Navy rear admiral and chaplain who serves as the 28th Chief of Chaplains of the United States Navy. He previously served as the 20th Chaplain of the Marine Corps. He also served for four years as the tenth Chaplain of the Coast Guard. Over a thirty-two year career, he has served in a variety of Navy, Marine Corps, and Coast Guard assignments, including deployments to Iraq and Afghanistan and chaplaincy work at Ground Zero in the wake of the September 11 attacks. He is a Lutheran.

Education
A Seattle, Washington native, Todd earned a bachelor of arts degree in theology and education from Concordia College in Portland, Oregon, in 1984. He received a Master of Divinity degree from Concordia Seminary in St. Louis, Missouri, and was ordained as a minister in the Lutheran Church–Missouri Synod in 1988. Chaplain Todd later earned a Doctor of Ministry degree in Christian Leadership from the Gordon–Conwell Theological Seminary in Charlotte, North Carolina, in 2009.

Career

Todd was commissioned as an Ensign in the United States Navy Reserve in 1986, providing ministry to Marine Corps Reserve units while concurrently serving as pastor for civilian churches in Illinois. He transferred to active duty in 1994 and served as Protestant chaplain at Naval Amphibious Base Coronado, California. From 1996 to 1998, Todd was chaplain aboard the Ticonderoga-class guided missile cruiser USS Chancellorsville.

Todd served his first tour with the Coast Guard from 1998 to 2002, serving as chaplain at Coast Guard Activities New York. While there, he was the first Navy chaplain to arrive at the World Trade Center site after the September 11 attacks, and hosted a Coast Guard Chaplain Emergency Response Team of thirty Navy chaplains working with the Coast Guard, that ministered to civilians and emergency crews at various locations, including Ground Zero, the family center, and One Police Plaza. He was also part of response teams that responded after the crashes of EgyptAir Flight 990 and American Airlines Flight 587.

Todd returned to ministry within the Marine Corps in 2002, reporting to the Second Force Service Support Group based at Camp Lejeune, North Carolina. He deployed to Kuwait with the group's Forward Battalion at a part of Operation Iraqi Freedom. In 2004, he deployed to Afghanistan with the 22nd Marine Expeditionary Unit in support of Operation Enduring Freedom. setting up the ministry at Forward Operating Base Ripley in Afghanistan's Oruzgan Province. In May 2005, he assumed the duties as officer in charge of Marine Corps Chaplain and RP Expeditionary Skills Training (CREST) at Camp Johnson, a post he held until October 2008. He then attended the Senior Supervisory Chaplain Course, after which he reported aboard USS Kearsarge as command chaplain.

Todd returned to the Marine Corps again in July 2010, as chaplain for the 2nd Marine Logistics Group; in this capacity, he led transition and support ministries for Sailors and Marines deploying or redeploying from Afghanistan, and led a chaplain team in Ramstein, Germany supporting Third Location Decompression programs for Explosive Ordnance Disposal Marines, helping to facilitate their transition after a deployment described as "kinetic". In February 2013, he departed 2nd MLG and reported aboard as force chaplain for II Marine Expeditionary Force, leading II MEF's religious program for 50,000-plus Marines, Sailors, and family members.

Todd returned for his second tour with the Coast Guard in June 2014, relieving Captain Gary Weeden as Chaplain of the Coast Guard. He was relieved by Captain Thomas Walcott in April 2018.

At the end of February 2022, Todd was nominated for promotion to two-star rear admiral and appointment as the next Chief of Chaplains of the United States Navy. Todd subsequently succeeded Brent W. Scott as Chief of Chaplains of the United States Navy on 16 March 2022.

Awards and Qualifications
Todd's awards include:

He is also qualified as a Master Training Specialist.

References

External links

|-

Year of birth missing (living people)
Living people
Lutheran Church–Missouri Synod people
Concordia University (Oregon) alumni
Military personnel from Seattle
20th-century American Lutheran clergy
United States Navy chaplains
Gordon–Conwell Theological Seminary alumni
Chaplains of the United States Coast Guard
United States Navy admirals
Chaplains of the United States Marine Corps
Chiefs of Chaplains of the United States Navy
Concordia Seminary alumni
21st-century American Lutheran clergy